Berrypecker may refer to:
One of six species of berrypecker in the bird family Melanocharitidae
One of two species of painted berrypecker in the bird family Paramythiidae

See also
Pecker (disambiguation)